Diana Lewis (September 18, 1919 – January 18, 1997) was an American film actress and a Metro-Goldwyn-Mayer contract player.

Early years 
The daughter of vaudeville performers, Lewis was born in Asbury Park, New Jersey. She attended Fairfax High School in Los Angeles.

Career 
Lewis was a singer with the orchestra led by Larry Leeds.

She began her film career in It's a Gift (1934) and worked steadily over the next few years, usually in minor roles. Her more notable films include It's a Gift, Gold Diggers in Paris (1938), Go West (1940), and Johnny Eager (1941). She was the love interest of Andy Hardy as Daphne Fowler in Andy Hardy Meets Debutante (1940).

Marriage
Lewis met actor William Powell, who was 27 years her senior, at MGM in 1940. They married at a dude ranch in Nevada on January 5, 1940, after a courtship of less than a month. She retired from acting in 1943. Lewis became known as Mousie Powell after her marriage. Lewis was a supporter of the LPGA tour. She was an honorary member and established the William and Mousie Powell Award in 1986, though it was renamed in 2019. The couple remained together for 44 years until Powell's death at age 91 in 1984.

Death
Lewis died from pancreatic cancer in Rancho Mirage, California, aged 77. She was interred at Cathedral City's Desert Memorial Park in Riverside County, California, alongside Powell, and her stepson, William David Powell.

Affiliations and honors
Lewis was an active supporter of women's golf and the LPGA. The LPGA's William and Mousie Powell Award is named in honor of the Powells.

In 2000, a Golden Palm Star on the Palm Springs, California, Walk of Stars was dedicated to her.

Complete filmography

References

External links

 

1919 births
1997 deaths
American film actresses
Burials at Desert Memorial Park
Deaths from cancer in California
Deaths from pancreatic cancer
Metro-Goldwyn-Mayer contract players
People from Asbury Park, New Jersey
People from Greater Los Angeles
Actresses from New Jersey
20th-century American actresses